Guy Côté (born December 30, 1965) is a Canadian politician and salesman. Côté was the Member of Parliament for the riding of Portneuf—Jacques-Cartier from 2004–2006.

Born in Quebec City, Quebec, Côté has been involved in many non-profit organizations in Portneuf, among other things, serving as a School commissioner in Portneuf, Quebec (2003–2004) before being elected to the House of Commons of Canada in the 2004 federal election for the Bloc Québécois, a left-wing separatist party, in the riding of Portneuf—Jacques-Cartier. Côté is a former salesman. He worked briefly as a salesman for CKNU  a local radio station of his riding.  He has also been assistant to the former Bloc MP of Portneuf.  During the 1980s, at the time of the beau risque and the Meech Lake constitutional reform, he was a member of the local association of the PC party in the riding of Langelier (now Quebec), under Gilles Loiselle, a strong believer in Canadian federalism.

After the 2004 election, Côté soon became an important player of the Bloc opposition in Parliament as assistant Finance critic for the Bloc.  In September 2005, he became the Intergovernmental Affairs and Privy Council critic. He sat on the Finance committee, on the subcommittee on Fiscal Imbalance and on the Official Languages committee.  According to www.howdtheyvote.ca, during the 38th Legislature, he was the new Quebec MP who spoke the most in the House of Communs and ranked 38th among all MPs.

Côté was defeated by one of Quebec City's most notorious shock-radio hosts, André Arthur, who ran as an independent. Arthur officially became a candidate on January 2, 2006, three weeks before election day, and spent less than $1000 for his campaign but ran an intensive pre-campaign every day for about two months during his morning and noon shows.

External links
How'd They Vote?: Guy Côté's voting history and quotes

1965 births
Bloc Québécois MPs
French Quebecers
Living people
Members of the House of Commons of Canada from Quebec
Politicians from Quebec City
21st-century Canadian politicians